Jewish resistance may refer to:
Jewish Resistance Movement, a Jewish underground movement in Mandate Palestine
Jewish resistance in German-occupied Europe